Coasties could refer to:

 Coastie, a term used in Midwestern U.S. universities to denote students who come from outside of the region
 Coastie (bicycle), a type of fixed-gear, single-speed bicycle utilizing a Coaster Brake rear hub
 Coasties, an informal term for a member of the United States Coast Guard
 Coastal defence ship